Rachid El Khalifi (born 16 June 1979 in Rotterdam) is a Dutch footballer, who currently plays for SC Feyenoord.

Career

Netherlands
Khalifi began his career with Dordrecht in the Dutch Eerste Divisie in 2000, playing over 120 games for the team over 5 seasons before moving to Emmen in 2005. He played in 72 matches for Emmen and scored 12 times in his 2 years with the team, before moving again, this time to Cambuur Leeuwarden in 2007.

Khalifi was a key component to the success of Cambuur's 2008–2009 campaign, which ended with the team finishing with a 20–9–9 record, and a trip to a third-place finish in the Eerste Divisie's regular season standings.

United States
El Khalifi signed with Real Salt Lake in July 2009, after trialling with them through the 2009 season. He made his RSL debut on 8 August 2009 at Rio Tinto Stadium against Seattle Sounders FC, coming on as a second-half substitute.

References

1979 births
Living people
Dutch footballers
Dutch expatriate footballers
FC Emmen players
FC Utrecht players
Real Salt Lake players
SC Cambuur players
Footballers from Rotterdam
Eerste Divisie players
Expatriate soccer players in the United States
Major League Soccer players
SC Feyenoord players
Association football forwards
Association football midfielders